The South Korean National Computerization Agency (NCA) is a statutory government agency acting as Korea's top IT policy and technical support agency.

Overview 
The agency was founded by Article 10 of the Framework Act on Information Promotion for the purpose of promoting computerization and to support development of related policies for Korean national agencies and local governments.

NCA was able to launch an e-Government project to enhance public convenience and improve administrative efficiency.

History

1987   Established for the NBIS Project
1995   KII-G Project
1997   Government Information  Exchange Center, IT Evaluation
1999   Cyber Korea 21
2000   National Knowledge & Information Resources Management Project
2001   Information Certification Center
2002   e-Korea Vision 2006, NII Back-up Center
2003   Establishment of Korea-Mexico IT Cooperation Center
2004   Establishment of Korea-Chile IT Cooperation Center
2004   Commencement of BcN Project such as Home Network, RFID, etc.

Organization
 Staff   202 Members (as of 2005)
 Budget (FY 2005) of 455 million USD

References

External links
 National Computerization Agency Official website.  
 Ministry of Information and Communication Official website of Korean Ministry of Information and Communication

Science and technology in South Korea
Government agencies of South Korea